The 2013 season is the 91st season of competitive football in Ecuador.

National leagues

Serie A

Clubs in international competition

Barcelona

Copa Libertadores

Group 1

Emelec

Copa Libertadores

Group 4

Round of 16: Match F

LDU Quito

Copa Libertadores

First stage

National teams

Senior team

2014 FIFA World Cup qualification

Friendlies

U-20 team

South American Youth Championship

U-17 team

References

External links
Official website  of the Ecuadorian Football Federation 
2013 league seasons on RSSSF

 
2013